Pillette Road Truck Assembly Plant was a Chrysler automobile factory in Windsor, Ontario, Canada.  The plant built the Dodge Ram Van and Dodge Ram Wagon from its opening in 1974 to its closing in 2003.   Total lifetime production was 2,309,399 units with a peak production of 124,124 in 1984.

Products 

1974-2003 Dodge Ram Van/Dodge Ram Wagon

Closing 
As the full size van market declined, and Chrysler's share of the market shrunk, Chrysler discontinued the Ram Van and Wagon in 2003.  Unable to secure a replacement product, the plant closed July 2003, despite a recently constructed paint shop building.  The original assembly plant and adjacent paint shop building were subsequently demolished.

See also 
 List of Chrysler factories

References

External links 

 Pillette Memories

Chrysler factories
Former motor vehicle assembly plants
Motor vehicle assembly plants in Canada
Economy of Windsor, Ontario
1974 establishments in Ontario
2003 disestablishments in Ontario
Demolished buildings and structures in Ontario
Buildings and structures demolished in 2004
History of manufacturing in Ontario